Nittedal Station is a railway station on the Gjøvik Line at Rotnes in Akershus county, Norway. The station was opened in 1900 as a stop for passengers and freight two years ahead of the opening of the Gjøvik Line in 1902.

In 1907 Nittedal was upgraded from a stop to a station staffed to expedite trains, passengers and freight. In the years in between a station building was also erected that had been drawn by architect Paul Armin Due. In 1971, after almost 70 years of being in service, the station became fully automated and remotely controlled.

Today the station is unstaffed and furnished with ticket machines. Its elevation is 235.8 m AMSL and the distance to Oslo Central Station is 24.26 km. The main building now serves as a café.

The station is reportedly haunted, and it was featured on the Norwegian television show "Åndenes Makt", a show about paranormal activities.

Sources 
   Entry at Jernbaneverket 
  Norsk Jernbaneklubb.no (Norwegian Railway Association) – page about Nittedal Station

Railway stations in Nittedal
Railway stations on the Gjøvik Line
Railway stations opened in 1900
1900 establishments in Norway